Flexivirga lutea is a  Gram-positive, aerobic and non-motile bacterium from the genus Flexivirga which has been isolated from feces of the bird Crested ibis.

References

External links
Type strain of Flexivirga lutea at BacDive -  the Bacterial Diversity Metadatabase

Micrococcales
Bacteria described in 2016